Stelios Arvanitis (born 1927) was a Greek basketball player. He competed in the men's tournament at the 1952 Summer Olympics.

References

External links

1927 births
Possibly living people
Greek men's basketball players
Olympic basketball players of Greece
Basketball players at the 1952 Summer Olympics
Basketball players from Athens